Greenhough is a surname. Notable people with the surname include:

 Bobby Greenhough (1939-  ) (actually Bobby Greenough), English rugby league footballer of the 1950s and 1960s
 Dorothy Greenhough-Smith (1882–1965), British figure skater
 Herbert Greenhough Smith (1855–1935), the first editor of The Strand magazine
 Tommy Greenhough (1931–2009), Lancashire and England cricketer
 George Bellas Greenough (1778-1855) (spelt Greenhough on an 1827 print of his villa in Regents Park), pioneering English geologist

See also
 Greenhoff